The Zervreilahorn is a mountain of the Swiss Lepontine Alps, located south of Vals in the canton of Graubünden. The mountain overlooks the Zervreilasee on the north.

References

External links
 Zervreilahorn on hikr.org - photos

Mountains of the Alps
Mountains of Switzerland
Mountains of Graubünden
Lepontine Alps
Two-thousanders of Switzerland
Vals, Switzerland